Damien Fahrenfort (also known as "Dooma") (born 10 November 1986) is a South African business person, professional surfer, web-content creator, producer and journalist born in Cape Town, South Africa.

Damien Fahrenfort was a competitor on the World Surf League qualifying series tour between 2006 and 2011. His best result as a top level professional surfer was 3rd place in the 2011 Copa Quiksilver El Salvador at Punta Roca in La Libertad, La Libertad, El Salvador.

Since retiring from full-time surf competition, he has been active with the business world and surfing-related journalism, including his surfing industry insider's blog entitled, "Doomas Rumors".

After immigrating to the United States in the mid-2010s, Fahrenfort has worked with marketing for Orange County-based Quiksilver industries, run the US division of the Australian surfing publication, Stab, and has managed the careers of some of the surfing world's top athletes.

He is also the co-founder and marketing director of Venice Beach’s "General Admission" boutique men's shop.

Filmography
2013: Ice Cream

Interviews about Fahrenfort
2011 Grind TV "Cote's Cube With Damien Fahrenfort" interview by Chris Cote
2012 Surfing Magazine (March) "Influencing Damien Fahrenfort" by Jason Miller
2013 Stab Magazine "Dooma Fahrenfort Ain't Lying" by Peter Taras
2013 Zig Zag Magazine (March) "Dooma Fahrenfort's No BS Interview"
2015 Beach Grit "Wow: South African takes over Venice!" by Chas Smith 
2015 The Hundreds "Venice Beach's Newest Menswear Boutique Bridges the City's Cultural History" by Tara Mahadevan
2016 Hayden Shapes (November) "An Interview with Damien "Dooma" Fahrenfort of General Admission" by Beau Flemisterb
2016 Oliver Grand "5 Minutes with Damien Fahrenfort of General Admission"

Articles/interviews written by Fahrenfort
2013 ISSUU "Kelly Slater Urban Jungle"
2016 Venice Ball "Q & A with VBL Founder Nick Ansom"
2016 Stab Magazine "Stab's picks for the 2016 World Title!" 
2016 Stab Magazine "The Eddie Aikau: Quiksilver Big Wave Invitational"
2016 Stab Magazine "These Are The 12 Best Waves Ridden in 2016"
2016 General Admission Magazine (Dec.) "Eazy E, N.W.A and Ithaka Darin Pappas's Iconic Imagery"

References

Living people
South African surfers
1986 births